Topper's Pizza or Toppers Pizza may refer to one of three pizza chains:

 Toppers Pizza (American restaurant)
 Topper's Pizza (Canadian restaurant)